The Order of the Blessed Sacrament is an enclosed congregation and a reform of the Dominican Order devoted to the perpetual adoration of the Blessed Sacrament.

History 
It was founded in the face of great opposition by Father Anthony Le Quieu, a French Dominican, whose canonization was stopped by the French Revolution. Born in 1601 at Paris, he entered the Order of Friars Preachers in the Rue St. Honoré, in 1622, and was in due time made master of novices first in his own monastery, and afterwards at Avignon (1634).

While at the latter place (1639), he began to lay the foundation of the institute he desired to establish, but it was not till twenty years later (1659) that, after great difficulty, the first house was opened at Marseilles for the three ladies whom the saintly founder had begun to train at Avignon. The Bishop of Marseilles gave them the habit the following year, approved the rule and constitutions Father Le Quieu had drawn up, and erected them into a simple congregation.

It was not till after the death of the founder, who lived to see another foundation made at Bollène, that the constitutions were approved by Pope Innocent XII (1693), who authorized the nuns to take solemn vows and bound them to enclosure.

This was the first congregation instituted for the perpetual adoration of the Blessed Sacrament; it is not an austere one, but the degree of perfection put before the members by the founder is very high.

The original mother-house at Marseilles was suppressed at the French Revolution, when the nuns were dispersed, but it was reopened in 1816; the Bollene houses suffered more severely. Thirteen of the nuns endured martyrdom under the Commune.

The remainder of the Bollène community returned to their convent and resumed their work of perpetual adoration in 1802. The Bollene nuns sent three of their number with one lay sister, under the Reverend Mother Emilie Pellier to England to found a house at Cannington (1863), a community which was afterwards moved to Taunton in Somersetshire, where it has since remained. There is also a house at Oxford, and another near Newport.

After Father Le Quieu's death foundations were made in the south of France, and after the French Revolution other houses were founded in the same locality. Since then a house has been established in Normandy, from which another convent has been opened at Hal in Belgium.

References

Catholic female orders and societies